Rao Rajendra Singh is a leader of Bharatiya Janata Party. He was the Deputy Speaker of Rajasthan Legislative Assembly and a former Member of Legislative Assembly from Shahpura in Jaipur district.

References

External links
Rao Rajendra Singh Official site 

Rajasthan MLAs 2013–2018
People from Jaipur district
Living people
Year of birth missing (living people)
Bharatiya Janata Party politicians from Rajasthan